USS Pinckney (DDG-91) is an  in the United States Navy. She is named for African American Officer's Cook First Class William Pinckney (1915–1976), who received the Navy Cross for his courageous rescue of a fellow crewmember on board the aircraft carrier  during the Battle of Santa Cruz.

Pinckney was laid down on 16 July 2001 by Ingalls Shipbuilding, at Pascagoula, Mississippi; launched on 26 June 2002; and commissioned on 29 May 2004 at Naval Construction Battalion Center Port Hueneme. She is the first Arleigh Burke-class destroyer to be equipped with the AN/SPY-1D(V) Littoral Warfare Radar upgrade, which was fitted to all subsequent Flight IIA Arleigh Burkes.

As of January 2018, Pinckney is homeported at NS San Diego, and assigned to Destroyer Squadron 23.

Service history

Pinckney made her maiden deployment September 2005. During this deployment, she made port visits to Guam, Singapore, Australia, Fiji and Hawaii. During this deployment, Pinckney became the first ever guided missile destroyer to refuel and replenish the Mark Five (MK V) high-performance combatant craft. She returned home after five months underway on 24 February 2006.

On 16 February 2007, Pinckney was awarded the 2006 Battle "E" award.

Pinckney departed San Diego on 2 April 2007 along with the aircraft carrier  for a 6-month deployment. She returned home on 30 September 2007.

On 8 March 2014, Pinckney was diverted from a training mission in the South China Sea, to the southern coast of Vietnam, to help search for the missing Malaysia Airlines Flight 370.

Deployments
 September 2005-24 February 2006 Maiden deployment
 2 April 2007 – 30 September 2007 Western Pacific
 17 January 2020 – 5 October 2020 4th fleet

Awards

 Navy Unit Commendation - (Jul 2009 – Mar 2010, Sep 2011 – Jan 2012, Jul 2012 – May 2013)
 Navy E Ribbon - (2006)
 Humanitarian Service Medal - (10–21 Dec 2009)
 Arizona Memorial Trophy - (2009–2010)

Coat of Arms
 
Shield
Gules, on a grid shaped as an Aegis shield Sable the head of a trident issuing from base Argent (Silver Gray); overall a bald eagle's head erased Proper.

Gules (Scarlet) denotes courage and sacrifice. The black grid shaped like an Aegis shield refers to the destroyer class to which the Pinckney belongs and its state-of-the-art equipment and armament. It also suggests a mess grill, symbolizing the duties of William Pinckney as Navy Cook Third Class aboard the USS Enterprise at the time of his heroic act in saving his shipmate. The trident symbolizes authority at sea. The eagle's head denotes vigilance, resolve and seagoing defense of the United States. White (Argent) indicates integrity; black (Sable) signifies strength and fortitude.

Crest
On a wreath Argent and Gules a laurel wreath Proper surmounted by a demi-compass rose Celeste; overall a stylized Navy Cross.

The Navy Cross indicates the award for heroism made to William Pinckney for his exemplary actions under fire in saving the life of a fellow sailor during the battle of Santa Cruz. The compass-rose signifies navigational expertise and global action during World War II. The wreath of laurel represents honor and achievement.

Motto
A scroll Azure fimbriated and inscribed "PROUD TO SERVE".

Seal
The arms as blazoned in full color upon a white oval enclosed within a dark blue collar edged on the outside with a gold chain of ninety-one links and one locking link (a canting reference to the sip's designation as DDG 91) with the name "USS PINCKNEY" above and "DDG 91" below in gold letters.

References

External links 

 

Arleigh Burke-class destroyers
Destroyers of the United States
Ships built in Pascagoula, Mississippi
2002 ships